Nadapuram Road railway station (code: NDPR) is a railway station in the Kozhikode district, Kerala and falls under the Palakkad railway division of the Southern Railway zone, Indian Railways.

Railway stations in Kozhikode district